The Savio Rail Tunnel connects the Vuosaari Harbour with the Helsinki–Tampere main line in Kerava. It is near the capital city of Helsinki, Finland. The tunnel is single track, electrified and 13.5 kilometres long. Construction began in 2004, and the tunnel opened in November 2008. The tunnel is part of a 19-kilometre Vuosaari harbour rail.

References

Railway tunnels in Finland
Tunnels completed in 2008